Surendra Kumar is an Indian politician and is a Member of the Legislative Assembly of Delhi. He represents the Gokalpur (SC) constituency of Delhi and is a member of the Aam Aadmi Party political party. He was also the Member of Legislative Assembly between 2008 to 2013. 

Surendra Kumar joined the Aam Aadmi Party in the presence of National Convener Arvind Kejriwal and Delhi Election Head Sanjay Singh on 17 October 2019 at Party Office in ITO, Delhi.

Early life and education 
Surendra lives at East Jyoti Nagar in Delhi, and educated till 10th from CBSE Board Delhi.

Political career 
Surendra, represents the Gokalpur (SC) constituency of Delhi on the ticket of Bahujan Samaj Party and now a member of the Aam Aadmi Party political party.

References 

Delhi politicians
Living people
1957 births